Faruk Ilgaz (1922 – 16 July 2014) was the chairman of Türkiye Süper Ligi club Fenerbahçe SK from 1966 to 1974 and from 1976 to 1980.

He was also Mayor of Istanbul Province Municipality between 12 March 1968 – 6 June 1968. He died in 2014.

References

External links
Fenerbahçe official website presidents page

1922 births
2014 deaths
Fenerbahçe S.K. presidents
Turkish businesspeople
Mayors of Istanbul